During the United Nations Climate Change Conference 2009 (COP15), there was a rival conference in Copenhagen, Denmark, for deniers, called the Copenhagen Climate Challenge, which was organised by the Committee for a Constructive Tomorrow.

While COP15 attracted 33,200 delegates, the rival deniers' conference was attended by 60 people (15 journalists, 18 speakers, 27 audience). According to Lenore Taylor of The Australian, the attendees had an average age "well over 60". In closing his speech, Plimer stated that "They've got us outnumbered, but we've got them outgunned, and that's with the truth." Plimer also stated that "It's been freezing in Perth and bucketing down".

See also
United Nations Climate Change Conference 2009

References

2009 in the environment
Events in Copenhagen
Climate change conferences
December 2009 events in Europe
2009 in Copenhagen